Winna Góra may refer to the following places in Poland:
Winna Góra, Lower Silesian Voivodeship (south-west Poland)
Winna Góra, Łódź Voivodeship (central Poland)
Winna Góra, Greater Poland Voivodeship (west-central Poland)